Jason Tam (born June 28, 1982) is an actor and dancer, born in Honolulu, Hawaii. He graduated from Punahou School for high school and went to CAP 21 in New York City for musical theatre. His most notable roles include Markko Rivera on the daytime soap opera One Life to Live, Paul in the 2006 revival of the Broadway musical A Chorus Line (he was also featured in Every Little Step, a documentary about the auditions and casting for that production), the SQUIP in both the Off-Broadway and Broadway run of Be More Chill, of Xander in Lysistrata Jones on Broadway and Shoe on the teen drama Beyond the Break. His other stage performances include Les Misérables on Broadway, She Loves Me at The Guthrie Theatre, West Side Story, Oklahoma!, Footloose the Sacramento Music Circus, and King and I at Casa Manana. He is also a frequent collaborator with musical theatre writer Joe Iconis. In 2014 he joined the original cast of the Tom Kitt and Brian Yorkey collaboration If/Then at the Richard Rodgers Theater as David. He played the role for the entire run of If/Then. He can be heard on the 2014 Broadway’s Carols for a Cure album.

On April 1, 2018, he appeared in the live televised concert rendition of Andrew Lloyd Webber and Tim Rice's Jesus Christ Superstar as the apostle Peter. He starred as the SQUIP in the Off-Broadway run of Joe  Iconis' Be More Chill from July through September of 2018, and again on Broadway starting on March 10, 2019, and ending on August 11, 2019.

Theatre credits
Les Misérables, Gavroche (replacement), 1990s
A Chorus Line, Paul, (2006–08)
Lysistrata Jones, Xander, (2011–12)
Marry Me A Little, (2012)
If/Then, David, (2014–15)
 KPOP (musical), Epic (2017)Jesus Christ Superstar, Peter (2018)Be More Chill, The SQUIP (2018–2019)

DiscographyA Chorus Line (revival Broadway cast recording) - 2006Marry Me A Little (Off-Broadway cast recording) - 2012If/Then (original Broadway cast recording) - 2014 (#19 on US charts)
 Broadway's Carols for a Cure: 2014'' - 2014
’’Be More Chill’’ (Original Broadway Cast Recording) - 2019

Filmography

Awards and nominations

References

External links

 Broadway World Profile 

1982 births
Living people
American male television actors
American male dancers